Thomas John Wiedenbauer (born November 5, 1958) is a former Major League Baseball outfielder and MLB first-base coach for the Cleveland Indians.

Houston Astros 

Wiedenbauer was drafted by the Houston Astros in the seventh round of the 1976 Major League Baseball Draft. He played four games for the Astros during the 1979 season. He also spent time in the minor leagues as a pitcher. He retired following the 1983 season.

After his playing career ended, Wiedenbauer remained with the Astros as a minor league coach. He was the manager of the Double-A Columbus Astros from 1987 to 1988. He served as an Astros minor league manager and instructor for the next 20-plus seasons.

Cleveland Indians 

Wiedenbauer joined the Cleveland Indians as minor league field coordinator in 2011. The Indians named him first base coach, with additional responsibilities for outfielders and baserunning, on October 14, 2011. Wiedenbauer served under Indians manager Manny Acta, with whom Wiedenbauer worked in the Astros organization in the 1980s and '90s.

References

External links

1958 births
Living people
People from Menomonie, Wisconsin
Houston Astros players
Major League Baseball outfielders
Baseball players from Wisconsin
Sahuaro High School alumni
Minor league baseball managers
Baseball players from Tucson, Arizona
Cocoa Astros players
Columbus Astros players
Covington Astros players
Daytona Beach Astros players
Tucson Toros players